Jone Railomo Taginayavusa (26 February 1981 in Suva – 8 August 2009) was a Fijian rugby union player. He played as a prop.

Career
Railomo played in Fiji for Piteia. He moved to France, where he played for Racing Club Vichy for the 2005/06 season, then for Poitiers for 2006/07, returning to Racing Club Vichy for 2007/08. He was then assigned for Poitiers, for the 2008/09 season.

He gained his first cap for Fiji shorter after moving to France, on 10 June 2005, in the heavy loss to the All Blacks by 91-0. He then was inactive for a year due to injury. He was capped again after being selected for the Fijian squad for the 2007 Rugby World Cup finals, playing all the five matches in the successful campaign of his country. Fiji's World Cup run finished in the quarter-finals in a 37-20 loss to South Africa.

Railomo earned four more caps since then, holding 10 caps for his national side.

Death
Railomo died in the early hours of 8 August 2009 after being hospitalized a few days earlier because of a sickness. He was 28.

External links
Fiji profile
Scrum profile

References

1981 births
Fijian rugby union players
Rugby union props
2009 deaths
Fiji international rugby union players
Fijian expatriate rugby union players
Expatriate rugby union players in France
Fijian expatriate sportspeople in France
Sportspeople from Suva
I-Taukei Fijian people